The 1951–52 NBA season was the Royals fourth season in the NBA. They entered the season as the defending champions, and finished matching their 41 wins from the year prior, though had a better winning percentage due to having two fewer games.

Draft picks

Roster

Regular season

Season standings

x – clinched playoff spot

Record vs. opponents

Game log

Playoffs

|- align="center" bgcolor="#ccffcc"
| 1
| March 18
| Fort Wayne
| W 95–78
| Bobby Wanzer (26)
| Edgerton Park Arena
| 1–0
|- align="center" bgcolor="#ccffcc"
| 2
| March 20
| @ Fort Wayne
| W 92–86
| Bob Davies (29)
| North Side High School Gym
| 2–0
|-

|- align="center" bgcolor="#ccffcc"
| 1
| March 29
| Minneapolis
| W 88–78
| Bob Davies (26)
| Edgerton Park Arena
| 1–0
|- align="center" bgcolor="#ffcccc"
| 2
| March 30
| Minneapolis
| L 78–83 (OT)
| Vern Mikkelsen (19)
| Edgerton Park Arena
| 1–1
|- align="center" bgcolor="#ffcccc"
| 3
| April 5
| @ Minneapolis
| L 67–77
| Jim Pollard (22)
| Minneapolis Auditorium
| 1–2
|- align="center" bgcolor="#ffcccc"
| 4
| April 6
| @ Minneapolis
| L 80–82
| Bob Davies (21)
| Minneapolis Auditorium
| 1–3
|-

Player statistics

Season

Playoffs

Awards and records
 Bob Davies, All-NBA First Team
 Bobby Wanzer, All-NBA Second Team

Transactions

References

Sacramento Kings seasons
Roc
Rochester Royals
Rochester Royals